Jennifer Murphy is an American YouTube personality and former beauty pageant contestant.

Career 
Murphy is Founder and CEO of GoGirl Worldwide, an organization to empower girls and women globally through multi-media and live events. She is also the Founder of GoGirl Worldwide Magazine, a digital magazine to empower women. Murphy is also the co-owner of Viral Video Media Group. She is the producer of GoGirl SuperHero Series, GoGirl Entrepreneur and many other projects and with the emphasis on showcasing the "Joy In Giving" and with a focus on empowerment.

Pageants
Murphy won the Miss Oregon USA title in late 2003, having previously competed in the Miss Oregon system for Miss America. She represented Oregon at the Miss USA 2004 pageant held in April 2004 in the Kodak Theatre in Hollywood, California. Murphy placed in the top ten in the pageant, which was won by Shandi Finnessey of Missouri, only the second placement by a delegate from Oregon in over ten years.

Murphy has remained involved in pageants, hosting the Miss Oregon USA 2006 pageant, and judging the Miss South Carolina Teen USA 2006 pageant.  She has also been a judge for the Miss Washington pageant, the Miss Oregon pageant 2009 and the Miss Malibu 2010 pageants.

Television projects 
Murphy appeared on the fourth season of The Apprentice. Murphy was "fired" in the sixth week, along with three others. Murphy first spoke to Donald Trump about the possibility of appearing on his show when she was competing at the Miss USA pageant. The pageant is part of the Miss Universe Organization which is owned by Trump.

In October 2016, Murphy told Grazia that Trump had offered her job interviews a day after she had left The Apprentice. As she was leaving after an interview, a newly married Trump kissed her on the lips, which took her by surprise. Murphy said she ultimately declined his job offer, and that she would still vote for Trump in the 2016 election.

After appearing on The Apprentice in New York, she relocated to Los Angeles, California and pursued a career in entertainment. Murphy appeared in her first feature film Killer Movie, playing the role of Mrs. Falls, and appeared in an episode of CSI, playing the role of "Dream Girl".  Murphy has also been featured on Access Hollywood, 20/20, CNN, ABC, Fox, Fox Reality and Inside Edition.

Controversy
In April 2016, Murphy uploaded a video on her YouTube channel performing her song "I want to be NEENJA!" at a private party promoting her line of Murphy beds. In July 2016, Murphy removed the YouTube video and released an apology on Facebook after the video was widely shared on social media criticizing Murphy for her impersonation of a Japanese accent and lyrics featuring Asian stereotypes. Despite the removal of the video and apology, the song and references to the song can still be found in other videos uploaded to her YouTube channel. The video was re-uploaded on January 23, 2021.

Personal life

Murphy married Bill Dorfman, a dentist from ABC's reality show Extreme Makeover, on July 7, 2006. They were married at the Trump National Golf Club in Los Angeles. She filed for divorce on July 9, 2007, after one year of marriage.

Filmography

References

 An Interview with Jennifer Murphy, the "Apprentice" and a Whole Lot More, Yellow Pages, Accessed 5 April 2006
 Medford native tests her luck on ‘The Apprentice’ Mail Tribune, Accessed 5 April 2006
 Biography on The Apprentice website

External links

Miss USA official profile

Living people
American marketing people
Marketing women
Miss USA 2004 delegates
People from Medford, Oregon
Southern Oregon University alumni
Philanthropists from Oregon
The Apprentice (franchise) contestants
Participants in American reality television series
Year of birth missing (living people)